Bengt Johan Lundholm (born August 4, 1955) is a retired Swedish professional ice hockey player who played 275 games in the National Hockey League for the Winnipeg Jets between 1981 and 1986.

Lundholm was originally drafted by the Winnipeg Jets in the 1975 WHA Amateur Draft, 166th overall.  Before moving to North American, Lundholm played in his native Sweden and suited up for Leksands IF and AIK IF.  Lundholm joined the Jets (now playing in the National Hockey League) in 1981 and over five seasons and 275 regular season games, he scored 48 goals and 95 assists for 143 points. He returned to AIK for one more season before retiring in 1987. Internationally Lundholm played for Sweden at several tournaments, winning one silver and two bronze at the World Championships, and a bronze at the 1980 Winter Olympics.

Career statistics

Regular season and playoffs

International

External links

1955 births
Living people
AIK IF players
Ice hockey players at the 1980 Winter Olympics
Leksands IF players
Medalists at the 1980 Winter Olympics
Olympic bronze medalists for Sweden
Olympic ice hockey players of Sweden
Olympic medalists in ice hockey
People from Falun
Swedish expatriate ice hockey players in Canada
Swedish ice hockey left wingers
Undrafted National Hockey League players
Winnipeg Jets (WHA) draft picks
Winnipeg Jets (1979–1996) players
Sportspeople from Dalarna County